Samuel (Hebrew: שְׁמוּאֵל Šəmūʾēl, Tiberian: Šămūʾēl) is a male given name and a surname of Hebrew origin. From its appearance it seems to have the meaning of "God has set" or "God has placed", appearing to derive from the Hebrew Śāmū (שָׂמוּ) + ʾĒl (God has set/placed). The Hebrew śāmū is also related to the Akkadian šâmū (𒊮𒈬), which shares the same meaning. However, from the explanation given in 1 Samuel 1:20, the name would seem to come from a contraction of the Hebrew שְׁאִלְתִּיו מֵאֵל (Modern: Šəʾīltīv mēʾĒl, Tiberian: Šĭʾīltīw mēʾĒl), meaning "I have asked/borrowed him from God". This is the verse in which the Prophet Samuel's mother Hannah names her son, after praying that she would be able to give birth. Her prayers having been answered, she dedicates the child to God as a Nazirite. Samuel was the last of the ruling judges in the Old Testament. He anointed Saul to be the first King of Israel and later anointed David.

As a Christian name, Samuel came into common use after the Protestant Reformation. Famous bearers include the American inventor Samuel F. B. Morse (1791–1872), the Irish writer Samuel Beckett (1906–89) and the American author Samuel Clemens (1835–1910), who wrote under the pen name Mark Twain.

The name Samuel is popular amongst Black Africans, as well as among African Americans. It is also widespread amongst the modern Jewish communities, especially Sephardic Jews. It is also quite popular in countries that speak English, French, German, Dutch, Spanish, and Portuguese, as well as in Ireland, Scotland, Scandinavia, Poland, the Czech Republic and Slovakia.

Translations
Amharic: ሳሙኤል(Samuel)
Arabic: صموئيل (Ṣamūʾīl), شموئيل (Šamūʾīl)
Armenian: Սամվել (Samvel), Սամուէլ (Samuēl)
Belarusian: Самуіл (Samuil)
Bulgarian: Самуил (Samuil)
Burmese: ဆမ်မြူရယ် (Sam, myu, yal) 
Cantonese: 森姆 (Summo) 
Chinese Simplified: 塞缪尔 (Sāimóuěr, Sàimiùěr)
Chinese Traditional: 山繆 (Sāimóu, Sàimiù)
Croatian: Samuel
Czech: Samuel
Danish: Samuel
Dutch: Samuel 
English: Samuel, Sam, Sammy
Esperanto: Samuele  
Estonian: Saamuel
Faroese: Sámal
Filipino: Samuél
Finnish: Samuel, Samuli, Sami, Samppa, Samu
French: Samuel 
German: Samuel 
Georgian: სამუელი (Samueli)
Greek: Σαμουήλ (Samouí̱l, Samouēl) 
Gujarati: સેમ્યુઅલ (Sēmyu'ala)
Hawaiian: Kamuela
Hebrew: שְׁמוּאֵל (Modern: Šmūʾēl or Šəmūʾēl, Tiberian: Šămūʾēl)
Hindi: सैमुअल (Saimu'ala)
Hungarian: Sámuel, Sami, Samu
Icelandic: Samúel
Irish: Somhairle (So-ar-la)
Italian: Samuele, Samüèle
Japanese: サミュエル (Samyueru), サムエル (Samueru)
Javanese: ꦱꦩꦸꦮꦺꦭ꧀ (Samuwèl)
Kannada: ಸ್ಯಾಮ್ಯುಯೆಲ್ (Syāmyuyel)
Khmer: សាំយូអែល (Samyouel)
Korean: 사무엘 (Samuel)
Latin: Samuel
Macedonian: Самуил (Sámuil, Samoil)
Malayalam: ശമുവേൽ (Śhamu'vēl)
Malagasy: Samoela
Maltese: Samwel
Māori: Hamuera
Marathi: शमुवेल (Śamuvēla)
Mongolian: Самуел (Samuyel)
Nepali: शमूएल (Śamū'ēla)
Northern Sami: Sámmol
Norwegian: Samuel 
Old French: Samoël
Persian: ساموئل (Sâmu'el)
Polish: Samuel 
Portuguese: Samuel 
Punjabi: ਸਮੂਏਲ (Samū'ēla)
Russian: Самуил (Samuil, Samuel, Shamil), Самойло (Samojlo) 
Serbian: Самуило (Samuilo)
Shona:   Samero or Samere
Slovak: Samuel
Spanish: Samuel
Swahili: Samweli
Swedish: Samuel, Sami
Tamil: சாமுவேல் (Sāmuvēl)
Telugu: సమూయేలు (Śāmūyelu)
Thai: ซามูเอล (Sāmūxel)
Turkish: İsmail (Samuel)
Ukrainian: Самійло (Samíilo)
Urdu: سیموئیل
Welsh: Sawyl 
Yiddish: שמואל (Shmuel)
Yoruba: Samueli
Samoa: Samuelu

Feminine variants
Samuela
Samantha
Samuelle
Samuella
Samanta

Notable people

Samuel may refer to: (see also: Sam, Sammy, etc.)

Given name
Samuel (11th century BC), Biblical prophet
Samuel (musician) (born 1987), American indie pop artist
Samuel of Bulgaria, Emperor of the First Bulgarian Empire
Samuel of Ctesiphon, Syriac Orthodox Grand Metropolitan of the East
Samuel of Nehardea (c. 165–257),Talmudist
Samuel Aba ( 1041–1044), third King of Hungary
Samuel Adams (1722–1803), Founding Father of the United States
Samuel Alito (born 1950), associate justice of the U.S. Supreme Court
Samuel Amofa (born 1999), Ghanaian footballer
Samuel Arredondo (born 2002), American singer based in South Korea
Samuel Howell Ashbridge (1848–1906), American politician, mayor of Philadelphia
Shmuel Avishar (born 1947), Israeli basketball player
Samuel Barber (1910-1981), American composer
V.C. Samuel (1912-1998) Ecumenical Theologian and Historian 
Samuel L. M. Barlow I (1826–1889), American lawyer
Samuel L. M. Barlow II (1892–1982), American composer
Samuel Barnett (disambiguation), multiple people, including:
Samuel Barnett (reformer) (1844–1913), English clergyman and social reformer
Samuel Jackson Barnett (1873–1956), American physicist, discoverer of the Barnett effect
Samuel Barnett (actor) (born 1980), English actor
Samuel Bartsch (born 1990), German-born Japanese voice actor better known as Subaru Kimura
Samuel Beckett (1906–1989), Irish writer
Samuel Berger (boxer) (1884–1925), American heavyweight boxer
Shmuley Boteach (born 1966), American Orthodox rabbi, radio and television host, and author
Samuel P. Bush (1863–1948), American industrialist, patriarch of the Bush political family
Samuel de Champlain (1567-1635), French explorer of Canada
Samuel Clemens, birth name of Mark Twain (1835–1910), American author and humorist
Samuel Colt (1814–1862), American inventor and industrialist
Samuel Conway (born 1965), American chemical researcher and furry convention organizer
Samuel Cosmi (born 1999), American football player
Samuel Cunningham (born 1989), Thai footballer
Samuel Edmund Sewall (1799-1888), American lawyer, abolitionist, and suffragist
Samuel Eguavoen (born 1993), American football player
Samuel Fatu (born 1965), American professional wrestler and member of Anoa'i family
Samuel Francis Du Pont (1803–1865), Rear Admiral in the US Navy
Samuel Firmino de Jesus (born 1986), Brazilian footballer
Samuel Gibbs French (1818-1910), American military officer, Confederate Major General and planter
Samuel "Sam" Fuld (born 1981), American major league baseball outfielder and general manager 	
Samuel Goudsmit (1902-1978) - Dutch-American physicist
Samuel Goodman (disambiguation), multiple people, including:
Samuel Goodman (cricketer) (1877–1905), American cricketer
Samuel Goodman (rugby union) ( 1920–1924), American rugby union player and manager
Samuel "Shemp" Howard (birth name Samuel Horwitz), American actor and comedian, one of the original Three Stooges
Samuel Hui (born 1948), Hong Kong Cantopop musician, singer, songwriter, and actor
Samuel Huntington (disambiguation), multiple people, including:
Samuel Huntington (statesman) (1731–1796), American jurist, statesman, and revolutionary leader
Samuel Huntington (Ohio politician) (1765–1817), American jurist, Governor of Ohio 
Samuel P. Huntington (1927–2008), American political scientist
Samuel L. Jackson (born 1948), American film and television actor and film producer
Samuel Johnson (1709–1784), English writer
Samuel Tak Lee (born April 1939), Hong Kong property billionaire
Samuel A. LeBlanc I (1886–1955), American politician and judge
Samuel Little (1940–2020), American serial killer and rapist
Samuel Martin (disambiguation), multiple people
Samuel Martires (born 1949), Filipino lawyer and current Ombudsman of the Philippines
Samuel "Sam" Match (1923–2010), American tennis player
Samuel "Sam" McCullum (born 1952), American football wide receiver
Samuel McDowell (1735–1817), soldier and political leader in Kentucky
Samuel McKinney (1807–1879), Irish-born Presbyterian minister in the American South
Samuel Miklos Stern (1920–1969), Hungarian–British Orientalist
Samuel Mills (disambiguation), multiple people
Samuel Eliot Morison (1887–1976), American historian, professor, and Rear Admiral
Samuel Morse (1791–1872), American inventor and artist
Samuel Mosberg, American Olympic champion lightweight boxer
Samuel Mukooza (born 1989), Ugandan basketball player
Shamuel Nachmias (born 1954), Israeli basketball player
Samuel Tettey Nettey (1909-2007), Ghanaian politician
Samuel Ogeh (born 1968), Rivers State politician
Samuel Allyne Otis (1740–1814), Secretary of the US Senate
Samuel Pepys (1633–1703), English diarist, naval administrator, and Member of Parliament 
Samuel Hartt Pook (1827–1901), American naval architect 
Samuel Rabin (1905–1993), American lawyer and politician
Samuel Rabin (artist) (1903–1991) English sculptor, artist, and Olympic bronze medal wrestler
Samuel Rappaport ( 1971–1984), American politician from Pennsylvania
Samuel Rosa (born 1966), lead singer and guitarist of Brazilian rock band Skank
Samuel Rothschild (1899–1987), Canadian ice hockey player
Samuel "Sam" Sheppard (1923-1970), American neurosurgeon accused of killing his wife
Samuel Sewall (1652–1730), Puritan judge, involved in Salem witch trials
Samuel Sewall (1757–1814), American congressman
Samuel Tinsley (1847-1903), English chess player
Samuel José da Silva Vieira, (born 1974) Brazilian footballer
Samuel Wilson (1766–1854), American meatpacker and source of Uncle Sam
Samuel Winslow (1862–1940), American politician from Massachusetts
Samuel Witwer (born 1977), American actor and musician
Samuel Merrill Woodbridge (1819–1905), American clergyman, theologian, author, and professor
Samuel van der Putte (1690–1745), Dutch explorer of Tibet
Samuel Walton (1918-1992), American businessman, founder of Walmart
Samuel White (disambiguation) multiple people including:
Samuel A. White (1823–1878), American politician
Samuel Albert White (1870–1954), Australian ornithologist
Samuel White (Massachusetts politician) (1710–1769), lawyer in the Province of Massachusetts Bay
Samuel White (U.S. politician) (1770–1809), lawyer and U.S. Senator from Delaware
 Samuel Womack (born 1999), American football player

Surname

A-C
Abraham Samuel (died 1705), mulatto pirate of the Indian Ocean
Adolphe Samuel (1824–1898), Belgian music critic, conductor and composer
Adriana Samuel (born 1966), Brazilian volleyball player
Albert Samuel (c. 1876–1963), New Zealand politician
Alexander Lyle-Samuel (1883–1942), English businessman and politician
Amado Samuel (born 1938), former American baseball player
Ananda Rao Samuel (1928–1999), Indian bishop
Andy Samuel (1909–1992), American child actor
Anthony Samuel, Cook Islander professional rugby league footballer
António da Silva Samuel (born 1966 in Guinea-Bissau), Portuguese football player
Arthur Samuel, 1st Baron Mancroft (1872–1942), British politician
Arthur Samuel (computer scientist) (1901–1990), American computer scientist
Asante Samuel (born 1981), American football player
Asante Samuel Jr. (born 1999), American football player
Basil Samuel (1912–1987), British founder of property company Great Portland Estates
Benedict Samuel (born 1988), Australian actor, writer and director
Bernard Samuel (1880–1954), American politician, mayor of Philadelphia
Charles Samuel (1862–1939), Belgian sculptor, engraver and medalist
Charlesworth Samuel (died 2008), Antiguan politician
Christmas Samuel (1674–1764), Welsh Independent minister and writer
Christophe Samuel (born 1961), Malagasy politician
Clifford Samuel, British actor
Collin Samuel (born 1981), Trinidadian footballer
Curtis Samuel (born 1996), American football player

D-I
David Samuel (disambiguation)
Deebo Samuel (born 1996), American football player
Eboule Bille Samuel (born 1982), Cameroonian football player
Edmund W. Samuel (1857–1930), American politician
Edwin Samuel, 2nd Viscount Samuel (1898–1978), British politician
Ester Samuel-Cahn (1933-2015), Israeli statistician and educator
Evelin Samuel (born 1975), Estonian singer, actress and writer
Flora Samuel, British architect, author and academic
Fred Samuel (1897–c.1941), Welsh rugby player
Gene Samuel (born 1961), Trinidad and Tobago road bicycle racer and track cyclist
Glyn Samuel (1917–1985), Welsh cricketer
Graeme Samuel (born 1946), Australian businessman
Haile Samuel, Eritrean general
Harold Samuel (1879–1937), English pianist and pedagogue
Harold Samuel, Baron Samuel of Wych Cross (1912–1987), British founder of property company Land Securities
Harriet Samuel (1836–1908), English businesswoman and founder the jewellery retailer H. Samuel
 Sir Harry Simon Samuel (1853–1934), English politician
Heather Samuel (born 1970), retired sprinter from Antigua and Barbuda
Herbert Samuel, 1st Viscount Samuel, (1870–1963), British politician and diplomat
Howel Walter Samuel (1881–1953), British politician
Ian Samuel (1915–2010), Royal Air Force pilot, British diplomat, director of chemical and agrochemical trade associations

J-P
James Samuel (1824–1874), British railway engineer
Jamile Samuel (born 1992), Dutch sprinter
Jlloyd Samuel (born 1981), Trinidadian footballer
Joanne Samuel (born 1957), Australian actress
John Samuel (rugby union) (1868–1947), Welsh rugby player
John S. Samuel (1913–2002), U.S. Air Force general
Jonathan Samuel (1852/3–1917), British manufacturer and politician
Joseph Samuel (c. 1780–1806), English criminal who survived execution
Juan Samuel (born 1960) Dominican-American baseball player
Judy Samuel (born 1943), British swimmer
Khari Samuel (born 1976), American football player
Leighton Samuel, Welsh businessman, owner of football teams
Lissy Samuel (born 1967), Indian cricketer
 Dame Louise Samuel (died 1925), English suffragist and charity worker
Mar Samuel (1909–1995), Metropolitan and Archbishop of the Syriac Orthodox Church of Antioch, buyer of the Dead Sea scrolls
Marcus Samuel (disambiguation)
Martin Samuel (born 1964), British journalist
Maurice Samuel (1895–1972), Romanian-born British and American novelist, translator and lecturer
Moran Samuel (born 1982), Israeli paralympic basketball player and world champion rower
Moses Samuel (1795–1860), British clockmaker, translator of Hebrew works and writer
Myron Samuel (born 1992), Vincentian footballer
Oliver Samuel (1849–1925), New Zealand politician
Pamela Richards Samuel (born 1959), U.S. Virgin Islander politician
Peter Samuel, 4th Viscount Bearsted (1911–1996), British soldier and banker
Pierre Samuel (1921–2009), French mathematician

R-X
Randy Samuel (born 1963), Trinidadian-Canadian soccer player, manager and coach
Raphael Samuel (1934–1996), British historian
Reuben Samuel (1828–1908), stepfather of American outlaws Frank and Jesse James
Rhian Samuel (born 1944), Welsh composer
Richard Samuel (fl.1770–1786), English portrait painter
Richard Samuel (prefect) (born 1952), French prefect
Robert Samuel (died 1555), English priest, one of the Ipswich Martyrs
Samuel Samuel (1855–1934), British businessman and politician
Sandra Samuel (born c. 1964), Indian nanny who saved the life of a two-year-old child during Mumbai terrorist attacks in 2008
 Sir Saul Samuel (1820–1900), Australian colonial merchant, politician and pastoralist
Seal Henry Samuel (born 1963), British musician commonly known simply as Seal
Shandel Samuel (born 1982), Vincentian footballer
Sigmund Samuel (1868–1962), Canadian industrialist 
Silvio Samuel (born 1975), Nigerian professional bodybuilder
Stanley Bernard Stephen Samuel (born 1986), Malaysian footballer
Thangadurai Samuel, Indian classical guitarist
Tony Samuel (born 1955), American football coach and former player
Walter Samuel, 2nd Viscount Bearsted, (1882–1948), British soldier, company chairman and art collector
Walter Samuel (born 1978), Argentine footballer for Inter Milan
Wolfgang W.E. Samuel (born 1935), German-born American author and veteran of the U.S. Air Force
Xavier Samuel (born 1983), Australian actor

Fictional characters 
Samuel Gerard, supervisor of U.S. marshals in The Fugitive
Samuel Vimes, captain and, later, commander of the Ankh-Morpork City Watch in the Discworld series
Samuel "Zammo" Maguire, a main character in Grange Hill

See also
Books of Samuel of the Bible
Samael, a similar name
Shmuel (disambiguation), Hebrew equivalent of Samuel
Shamil, Arabic equivalent of Samuel
Kamuela, Hawaiian equivalent of Samuel

Notes

Hebrew masculine given names
Theophoric names
English masculine given names
French masculine given names
German masculine given names
Dutch masculine given names
Irish masculine given names
Scottish masculine given names
Polish masculine given names
Czech masculine given names
Slovak masculine given names
Norwegian masculine given names
Swedish masculine given names
Danish masculine given names
Icelandic masculine given names
Finnish masculine given names
Spanish masculine given names
Portuguese masculine given names